The 2017 3. deild karla (English: Men's Third Division) was the 5th season of fourth-tier Icelandic football in its ten team league format. The league began on 12 May and concluded on 16 September.

Teams
The league was contested by ten clubs. Eight remained in the division from the 2016 season, while four new clubs joined the 3. deild karla:
 Ægir and KF were relegated from the 2016 2. deild karla, replacing Tindastóll and Víðir who were promoted to the 2017 2. deild karla
 Berserkir and KFG were promoted from the 2016 4. deild karla, in place of KFR and KFS who were relegated to the 2017 4. deild karla

Club information

2017 Member Clubs

League table

Results grid
Each team plays every opponent once home and away for a total of 18 matches per club, and 90 matches altogether.

Top goalscorers

References

External links
 Fixtures at ksí.is

Iceland
Iceland
3